Aspidoscelis cozumela, the Cozumel racerunner, is a species of teiid lizard endemic to Mexico.

References

cozumela
Endemic reptiles of Mexico
Reptiles described in 1906
Taxa named by Hans Friedrich Gadow